Joslin is a surname. Notable people with the surname include:

Alfred H. Joslin (c. 1914–1991), American judge
David B. Joslin (born 1936), American bishop
Derek Joslin (born 1987), Canadian professional ice hockey defenceman
Elliott P. Joslin (1869–1962), first doctor in the United States to specialize in the treatment of diabetes 
Les Joslin (born 1947), Australian cricketer
Margaret Joslin (1983–1956), American film actress
Murray Joslin (1901–1981), American electrical engineer who made major contributions to nuclear power
Peter Joslin (born 1933), British police officer, Chief Constable of Warwickshire Police and Deputy Lieutenant of Warwickshire
Phil Joslin (footballer) (1916–1980), English professional footballer 
Phil Joslin (referee) (born 1959), English association football referee
Raymond E. Joslin (1936–2013), American businessman and cable executive
Rebecca Richardson Joslin (1846–1934), American author, lecturer, benefactor, clubwoman
Sesyle Joslin (born 1929), American children's author
Theodore Goldsmith Joslin (1890–1944), press secretary to President Herbert Hoover from 1931 to 1933
Isaac Joslin Cox (1873–1956), American professor of history